José de Carvajal y Lancáster (1698–1754) was a Spanish statesman.

Biography
He was son of the Duke of Liñares and his mother was descendant of infante Jorge de Lancastre, a natural son of King John II of Portugal. After graduating at the University of Salamanca, he was appointed oidor (judge) of the Chancillería of Valladolid and later councillor of the Council of the Indies. Prime minister José del Campillo elected him as his personal secretary. In 1746, he was appointed president of the Junta of Commerce and Money, and promoted the establishment of chartered corporations for the improvement of regional trade and manufacture.

The new king Ferdinand VI appointed him First Secretary of State that same year, and carried out a neutrality policy. In 1750, he signed the agreement between Spain and Portugal that finished the disputes over the borders of Río de la Plata and Brazil; Colonia del Sacramento returned to Spain in exchange of some Paraguayan territories.

He reformed the royal mail and in 1752 founded definitively the Real Academia de Bellas Artes de San Fernando.

Bibliography

Molina, Juan: José de Carvajal: un ministro para el reformismo borbónico, Cáceres: Institución Cultural El Brocense, 1999
Delgado, José Miguel: El proyecto político de Carvajal: pensamiento y reforma en tiempos de Fernando VI, Madrid: CSIC, 2001

References

External links 
 

1698 births
1754 deaths
People from Cáceres, Spain
Knights of the Golden Fleece of Spain
University of Salamanca alumni
Prime Ministers of Spain